The Real World Homecoming: Los Angeles is the second season of the spin-off miniseries of The Real World, that reunited seven of the nine cast members of the second season of the show to live in the same Venice beach house they lived in for the original series. Dominic Griffin and Aaron Behle did not participate in the reunion.

The Real World Homecoming was renewed for two more seasons on September 29, 2021. It was also announced that the second season would be reuniting the cast of The Real World: Los Angeles and would premiere on Paramount+ on November 24, 2021.

Episodes

References

External links

2021 American television seasons
2022 American television seasons
Television shows set in Los Angeles
The Real World (TV series)
Television shows filmed in Los Angeles